Elame a Doo was a ruler of the Bonapriso sublineage of the Duala people who lived on the Wouri estuary of Cameroon in the late 19th century. He was the son of Doo a Priso and the grandson of Priso a Doo. Elame signed the 1884 German-Duala treaty that granted the German Empire sovereignty over Cameroon.

References
Austen, Ralph A., and Derrick, Jonathan (1999): Middlemen of the Cameroons Rivers: The Duala and their Hinterland, c. 1600–c.1960. Cambridge University Press.

Cameroonian traditional rulers
19th-century rulers in Africa